RADARSAT-1 was Canada's first commercial Earth observation satellite. It utilized synthetic aperture radar (SAR) to obtain images of the Earth's surface to manage natural resources and monitor global climate change. As of March 2013, the satellite was declared non-operational and is no longer collecting data.

Mission 
Developed under the management of the Canadian Space Agency (CSA) in co-operation with Canadian provincial governments and the private sector, it provided images of the Earth for both scientific and marketing purposes. RADARSAT-1's images were useful in many fields, including agriculture, cartography, hydrology, forestry, oceanography, geology, ice and ocean monitoring, arctic surveillance, and detecting ocean oil slicks.

History 
The Canadian Space Agency (CSA) RADARSAT-1 project was conceived in the early 1980s and included discussions with NASA.

NASA provided the Delta II launch vehicle to launch RADARSAT-1 and access to the NASA Deep Space Network (NASA DSN) in exchange for access to its data. Estimates are that the project, excluding launch, cost CA$620 million. The Canadian federal government contributed about CA$500 million, the four participating provinces (Québec, Ontario, Saskatchewan and British Columbia) about CA$57 million, and the private sector about CA$63 million.

RADARSAT International, Inc. (RSI), a Canadian private company, was created in 1989 to process, market and distribute RADARSAT-1 data. (RADARSAT International, Inc. (RSI) was later acquired by MacDonald Dettwiler and Associates.) In 2006, RSI was rebranded MDA Geospatial Services International or MDA GSI.

Payload 
RADARSAT-1 used a synthetic aperture radar (SAR) sensor to image the Earth at a single microwave frequency of 5.3 GHz, in the C band (wavelength of 5.6 cm). Unlike optical satellites that sense reflected sunlight, SAR systems transmitted microwave energy towards the surface and recorded the reflections. Thus, Radarsat-1 imaged the Earth, day or night, in any atmospheric condition, such as cloud cover, rain, snow, dust or haze.

Each of RADARSAT-1's seven beam modes offered a different image resolution. RADARSAT-1 also had the unique ability to direct its beam at different angles.

Orbit 

With an orbital period of 100.70 minutes, RADARSAT-1 circles the Earth 14 times a day. The orbit path repeats every 24 days, this means that the satellite is in exactly the same location and could take the same image (same beam mode and beam position) every 24 days. This is useful for interferometry and detecting changes at that location that took place during the 24 days. Using different beam positions, a location can also be scanned every few days.

RADARSAT-1 was a right-looking satellite, meaning that the microwave beam transmits and receives on the right side of the satellite, relative to its orbital path. As it descends in its orbit from the North Pole, it faces west, and when it ascends from the South Pole, it faces east. Locations could therefore be imaged from opposite sides. Combined with the different beam modes and positions, this provided users with many possible perspectives from which to image a location.

End of service 
On 4 November 2010, RADARSAT-1 celebrated its 15-year service anniversary. It outlived its planned five-year lifetime by a wide margin. Radarsat-2 was launched on 14 December 2007 from Baikonur, Kazakhstan

RADARSAT-1 covered the Arctic daily, and most of Canada every 72 hours depending on instrument orientation and mode. It covered the entire Earth every 24 days.

On 29 March 2013, RADARSAT-1 experienced a technical problem. The Canadian Space Agency (CSA) assembled a team of engineers, who conducted an extensive investigation. Following numerous attempts to resolve the problem, the CSA, in consultation with its commercial data distributor MDA Geospatial Services Inc. concluded that RADARSAT-1 was no longer operational.

See also 

 RADARSAT-2
 RADARSAT Constellation

References

External links 
 RADARSAT-1 from the CSA

Earth observation satellites of Canada
Spacecraft launched in 1995
Spacecraft launched by Delta II rockets
Space synthetic aperture radar